Sverre Johannessen (4 May 1921 – 21 September 1993) was a Norwegian alpine skier. He was born in Bærum, and represented the club Stabæk IF. He participated at the 1948 Winter Olympics in  St. Moritz, and at the 1952 Winter Olympics in Oslo. His best placement was an eighteenth place in downhill at the 1948 Winter Olympics.

He became Norwegian champion in alpine combined 1947.

References

1921 births
1993 deaths
Sportspeople from Bærum
Norwegian male alpine skiers
Olympic alpine skiers of Norway
Alpine skiers at the 1948 Winter Olympics
Alpine skiers at the 1952 Winter Olympics